Karl Friedrich Geldner (17 December 1852 – 5 February 1929) was a German linguist best known for his analysis and synthesis of Avestan and Vedic Sanskrit texts.

Biography
Geldner was born in Saalfeld, Saxe-Meiningen, where his father was a Protestant clergyman.

Geldner studied Sanskrit and Avestan at the University of Leipzig in 1871 before moving to the University of Tübingen in 1872. He received a doctorate in Indological studies in 1875, and became a privatdozent following his habilitation in 1876. In 1887, Gelder moved back to the north-east, this time to Halle, where he was appointed extraordinary professor in 1890, followed by an extraordinary faculty-chairmanship at the University of Berlin a few months later.

Geldner lectured in Berlin for 17 years. In 1907, he moved to the University of Marburg where he had been appointed ordinary professor. He retired from active teaching in 1921, and remained in Marburg until his death in 1929.

Academic achievements
Geldner's first significant publication, though made public only in 1877, was written while he was still a doctoral student. The essay, which was in its expanded and published form titled Über die Metrik des jüngeren Avesta ("On the meter of the Younger Avesta"), was originally an answer to a prize essay question posed by the University of Tübingen's Faculty of Philosophy. His analysis revealed that although the texts had not retained a metrical form, the majority of the manuscripts were in 8 syllable verse (10 or 12 syllable lines also occurred).

Although the theory was subsequently revised by others, Geldner's hypothesis was reinstated in 1983, and the lines of the Younger Avesta are today considered to be historically related to the Vedic meters of the gayatri family. Unlike the meters of the Gathas, which are recited, the meters of the Younger Avesta are mostly sung.

Although Geldner would have preferred to research the Vedas (he would later state to had "lost" 15 years working on the Avesta), following the publication of his doctoral thesis, Geldner began to work on a revision of Westergaard's edition of the Avesta. What he initially assumed would occupy him for only a few years, eventually took 20 and it was not until 1886 that the first volume was published. That first volume (the Yasna) was followed by the Visperad and Khordeh Avesta in volume 2 (1889) and the Vendidad and Prolegomena in volume 3 (1895). Altogether, Geldner collated and documented over 120 manuscripts, and the greatest achievement of this laborious undertaking was "undoubtedly the Prolegomena, which provided an exact description of all manuscripts and their genealogical relationship" (so Schlerath, see references below).

Although Gelder published several Avesta-related articles while working on the revision, following the publication of volume 3 he returned to work almost exclusively on Sanskrit texts. Only two publications after 1895 deal with Avestan topics. Together with Richard Pischel he began to work on the Vedas, and their collaboration was subsequently published in the three volume Vedische Studien (Stuttgart: Kohlhammer Verlag, 1889–1901), which - unlike previous translations - avoided a purely linguistic methodology and instead took indigenous tradition into account. Following his return to Marburg in 1907, Geldner dedicated his efforts to a translation of the RigVeda, which was sent to his publisher in 1928 but did not reach the public until after the author's death in February 1929. The three volumes of his monumental Der Rig-Veda aus dem Sanskrit ins Deutsche übersetzt were finally released in 1951.

Select bibliography
 Metrik des jüngeren Avesta, Tübingen, 1877
 Studien zum Avesta, Strassburg, 1882
 Drei Yasht aus dem Zendavesta Übersetzt und erklärt, Stuttgart, 1884
 Avesta - Die heiligen Bücher der Parsen (3 vols.),  Stuttgart, 1885-1895Avesta, the Sacred Books of the Parsis (3 vols.), Stuttgart, 1896, 1891 and 1896
 70 Lieder des Rigveda übersetzt, together with Rudolph von Roth und Adolf Kägi, Tübingen, 1875
 Vedische Studien, together mit Richard Pischel (3 vols.), Stuttgart, 1889–1901
 Avestaliteratur, in: Grundriss der iranischen Philologie, ed. Kuhn and Geiger, Tübingen, 1904
 Der Rigveda in Auswahl (2 vols.), Stuttgart, 1907–1909
 Die indische Balladendichtung, Marburg, 1913
 Die zoroastrische Religion (Das Avesta), Tübingen, 1926
 Vedismus und Brahmanismus, Tübingen
 Der Rig-Veda aus dem Sanskrit ins Deutsche übersetzt (3 vols.), London and Wiesbaden, 1951Corrections and addendum (Namen- u. Sachregister zur Übersetzung, dazu Nachträge und Verbesserungen / Aus dem Nachlass des Übersetzers) by Johannes Nobel, Cambridge, 1957

References

External links
 

1852 births
1929 deaths
People from Saalfeld
German Protestants
People from Saxe-Meiningen
German philologists
German folklorists
Indo-Europeanists
Religion academics
German translators
Leipzig University alumni
University of Tübingen alumni
Academic staff of the Martin Luther University of Halle-Wittenberg
Academic staff of the Humboldt University of Berlin
Academic staff of the University of Marburg
German male non-fiction writers